Physematia defloralis is a moth in the family Crambidae. It was described by Strand in 1919. It is found in Taiwan.

References

Spilomelinae
Moths described in 1919